Hugh de Moravia (died c. 1219), Lord of Duffus, Strathbrock and Sutherland, was a Scottish noble.

He was the eldest son of William, the eldest son of Freskin, a Flemish settler who arrived in Scotland in the reign of King David I of Scotland. William had obtained a grant from King William I of Scotland, of the lands of Strathbrock in West Lothian, as well as Duffus, Roseisle, Inchkeil, Machir and Kintrae in Moray, between 1165 and 1171. Hugh inherited these lands upon the death of his father. He was granted a large estate around 1210 and was also known as Lord of Sutherland.

Marriage and issue
Hugh is known to have had the following issue:
William de Moravia, Earl of Sutherland (died 1248), had issue.
Walter de Moravia, Lord of Duffus and Strathbrock, married Euphemia de Ross, had issue.
Andrew de Moravia, Bishop of Moray (died 1242).

Notes

References

12th-century Scottish people
13th-century Scottish people
12th-century births
Year of birth unknown
1210s deaths
Year of death uncertain
Moray
People associated with West Lothian
De Moravia family
Clan Murray
Clan Sutherland